Events in the year 2019 in Eritrea.

Incumbents 

 President: Isaias Afewerki

Events 

 19 – 31 August – The country competed at the 2019 African Games in Rabat, Morocco.

Deaths

References 

 
2010s in Eritrea
Years of the 21st century in Eritrea
Eritrea
Eritrea